Markus Gickler (born 5 June 1966) is a former German male canoeist who won medals at senior level the Wildwater Canoeing World Championships.

References

External links
 Markus Gickler at Downriver.de

1966 births
Living people
German male canoeists
Place of birth missing (living people)